Diane Nukuri (born 1 December 1984, in Kigozi-Mukike) is a Burundian-American professional distance runner. She competed for Burundi as a fifteen-year-old in the 2000 Summer Olympics in Sydney in the 5,000m and in the 2012 Summer Olympics in London in the marathon. Nukuri ran for the University of Iowa in college. She was the Burundian flag bearer at the Summer Olympics in 2000 and 2012.

Early life
Nukuri began running in her early teens, starting little more than a year prior to her first Olympic experience (the 2000 Olympics in Sydney). She ran in the junior IAAF World Cross Country Championships twice, placing 18th in 2000 and 27th the following year. She won the bronze medal in the 10,000 meters at the 2001 Francophone Games in Ottawa, Ontario, Canada. After the games, Nukuri fled to Toronto, seeking asylum from the Burundi civil war. At the time, Nukuri had already lost her father to the conflict, and she knew she would have no running career had she stayed in Burundi. She was granted asylum, and lived with relatives in Pickering, Ontario, a suburb of Toronto.

The University of Iowa and Butler CCC
Nukuri continued to run while living in Canada and began drawing interest from cross country and distance track coaches from American universities, in particular the University of Iowa. However, Nukuri spoke very little English, so she attended Butler County Community College in El Dorado, Kansas. At Butler, Nukuri trained under Kirk Hunter while learning English (her third language), taking classes, and amassing 9 NJCAA national championships and 17 NJCAA All-American honors. After two seasons at Butler, Nukuri transferred to the University of Iowa to work with coach Layne Anderson, who recruited Diane directly out of high school. Anderson was largely responsible for Nukuri attending Butler.

In her time at Iowa, Nukuri won two Big Ten Championships, in cross-country (2007) and the 5,000 meters in outdoor track (2008). She was named an All-American three times and won the Wilma Rudolph student-athlete award. She left Iowa with school records in ten events.

In her final collegiate race (the NCAA Championships, 10,000 meters), a major side stitch forced Nukuri into an early exit with only a few laps remaining while in second place. She graduated from Iowa with a bachelor's degree in communications in the fall of 2008.

Professional career

She competed in her first professional race at the 2008 Shelter Island 10K. Major race performances are below.

Nukuri first competed in the Olympics at the age of 15, running the 5,000 meters at the 2000 Summer Olympics in Sydney. She finished 14th in her heat but did not advance to the finals. She returned to the Olympics twelve years later, competing in the women's marathon. She finished in 31st place, setting another Burundian National Record (she owned the previous mark in the marathon) in 2:30:13,. 118 runners started the race, and 107 finished. Nukuri was also the flag-bearer for Burundi, leading the country's six athletes at the opening ceremony. Nukuri also carried the flag in Sydney.

She bettered her national record at the NYC Half Marathon in March 2013, narrowly finishing second to Caroline Rotich in a time of 1:09:12 hours.

Nukuri is currently the Burundian record-holder in the 1,500 meters, 5,000 meters, 10,000 meters, half marathon, and the marathon. She continues training under Coach Anderson.

Her story has been documented in a number of articles, including Running Times in October 2012.

Diane Nukuri represented Burundi once again at the 2016 Olympic Games in Rio de Janeiro in August 2016, running the 10,000 meters.

She became a U.S. citizen in 2017. She holds dual citizenship from both Burundi and the United States. She became eligible to compete internationally for the United States in February 2020.

International competitions

Circuit results

Marathons

Other distances

See also
Burundi at the 2000 Summer Olympics
National records in the marathon 
List of Asics sponsorships
2000 Summer Olympics national flag bearers
2012 Summer Olympics closing ceremony flag bearers
Burundi at the 2016 Summer Olympics

References

External links 

1984 births
Living people
Sportspeople from Iowa City, Iowa
Track and field athletes from Iowa
Burundian female long-distance runners
Burundian female cross country runners
Burundian female marathon runners
American female long-distance runners
American female cross country runners
American female marathon runners
Olympic athletes of Burundi
Athletes (track and field) at the 2000 Summer Olympics
Athletes (track and field) at the 2012 Summer Olympics
Athletes (track and field) at the 2016 Summer Olympics
Athletes (track and field) at the 1999 All-Africa Games
African Games competitors for Burundi
21st-century American women